Omphalomia hirta is a species of snout moth. It was described by South in 1901. It is found in China.

References

Moths described in 1901
Pyralinae